Kernville is a census-designated place (CDP) in the southern Sierra Nevada, in Kern County, California, United States. The population was 1,549 at the 2020 United States census, up from 1,395 at the 2010 census, but below the 2000 census total of 1,736.

History
The Kern River was named after artist and topographer Edward Kern, who accompanied John C. Fremont on his 1845 expedition. They camped at what was a fork of two rivers, now the middle of Lake Isabella. An 1858 gold rush led to the formation of a town briefly called Rogersville, then Williamsburg, which was in 1863 renamed Whiskey Flat after a bar opened. In 1864, the town was renamed Kernville.

After decades of planning, the Isabella Dam project began in 1948. As a result, Kernville was relocated upstream to its present location at the tip of the northeast fork of the man-made lake, along with certain historic buildings. Downtown visibly retains Kernville's gold rush and Old West roots, attracting tourists along with the area's natural scenery and outdoor activities. The town's original location is slightly east of Wofford Heights. Foundations and other remnants can still be seen when the lake is low. The famous Mountain Inn, built mainly to house movie stars and crew before the 1948 move, is now (partially) at the new Kernville, renamed the River View Lodge.

Whiskey Flat Days is the annual celebration of the area's Wild West roots. A parade, historical re-enactments, pioneer-style camps, a carnival, street vendors and rodeo are just part of the festivities put on every President's Day weekend and attended by thousands of visitors.

Even with its annual summer influx of tourists, Kernville remains one of the most quaint, conservative relics of early California. Many local families trace their lineage to original 19th century homesteaders. The post office, established at the original site in 1868, was moved to the new site in 1951.

The original townsite is now registered as California Historical Landmark #132.

Geography

Climate
Climate type occurs primarily on the periphery of the true deserts in low-latitude semiarid steppe regions.

Points of interest
Kernville has a large tourist industry centered on the white water rapids of the Kern River.  While white water rafting and kayaking are the main attractions, one can also enjoy mountain biking, rock climbing, and other outdoor activities. Fly fishing is also popular; in particular, the golden trout is highly sought after for catch and release fishing.  Downtown Kernville has an Old West look and contains a number of restaurants, antique shops and motels. The Kern Valley Museum houses a collection of historical items and displays. Popular restaurants include Ewing's on the Kern, which has offered fine dining and scenic views in Kernville since 1954, and the Kern River Brewing Company, founded in 2005. The nearby Kern Valley Airport is a popular general aviation destination for pilots, with on-site services including riverside camping and a cafe.

Demographics

2010
The 2010 United States Census reported that Kernville had a population of 1,395. The racial makeup of Kernville was 1,257 (90.1%) White, 1 (0.1%) African American, 19 (1.4%) Native American, 7 (0.5%) Asian, 0 (0.0%) Pacific Islander, 33 (2.4%) from other races, and 78 (5.6%) from two or more races. Hispanic or Latino of any race were 82 persons (5.9%).

The Census reported that 1,387 people (99.4% of the population) lived in households, 8 (0.6%) lived in non-institutionalized group quarters, and 0 (0%) were institutionalized.

There were 723 households, out of which 111 (15.4%) had children under the age of 18 living in them, 312 (43.2%) were opposite-sex married couples living together, 57 (7.9%) had a female householder with no husband present, 28 (3.9%) had a male householder with no wife present.  There were 40 (5.5%) unmarried opposite-sex partnerships, and 5 (0.7%) same-sex married couples or partnerships. 282 households (39.0%) were made up of individuals, and 132 (18.3%) had someone living alone who was 65 years of age or older. The average household size was 1.92.  There were 397 families (54.9% of all households); the average family size was 2.50.

The population was spread out, with 184 people (13.2%) under the age of 18, 74 people (5.3%) aged 18 to 24, 197 people (14.1%) aged 25 to 44, 521 people (37.3%) aged 45 to 64, and 419 people (30.0%) who were 65 years of age or older.  The median age was 55.8 years. For every 100 females, there were 97.3 males.  For every 100 females age 18 and over, there were 98.9 males.

The homeowner vacancy rate was 5.1%; the rental vacancy rate was 13.5%.  1,018 people (73.0% of the population) lived in owner-occupied housing units and 369 people (26.5%) lived in rental housing units.

Transportation
The airport features a fly-in campground on site. An airfield cafe serves both pilots and visitors.

The city is also served by Kern Transit, connecting the Kern River Valley with the rest of the county.

California Historical Landmark
The California Historical Landmark reads:

NO. 132 KERNVILLE - Called Whiskey Flat until 1864, Kernville was founded in 1860 when whiskey dealer Adam Hamilton moved shop here from more temperate Quartzburg, founded earlier that year. Both camps resulted from a discovery by 'Lovely' Rogers, who found the Big Blue Ledge while tracking a stray mule from the earlier camp of Keysville.

The marker is located in the Old Kernville Cemetery, with a registration date of January 31, 1934.

See also
 California Historical Landmarks in Kern County
California Historical Landmark

External links
Kernville Chamber of Commerce 
Kern River Valley Museum and Historical Society
http://www.city-data.com/city/Kernville-California.html

References

Census-designated places in Kern County, California
Kern River Valley
Populated places in the Sierra Nevada (United States)
Populated places established in 1848
1848 establishments in California
Census-designated places in California
California Historical Landmarks